Klaus Ambrosch (born 23 May 1973 in Knittelfeld) is an Austrian decathlete. His personal best result was 8122 points, achieved in July 2001 at the Hypo-Meeting in Götzis. His life partner is the German long jumper Bianca Kappler.

Achievements

References

1973 births
Living people
People from Knittelfeld District
Austrian decathletes
Austrian male athletes
Athletes (track and field) at the 2000 Summer Olympics
Olympic athletes of Austria
Sportspeople from Styria